Fredericksburg is the name of some places in the U.S. state of Pennsylvania:
Fredericksburg, Blair County, Pennsylvania
Fredericksburg, Crawford County, Pennsylvania
Fredericksburg, Lebanon County, Pennsylvania